A chant is the rhythmic speaking or singing of words or sounds.

Chant or Chants may also refer to:

People with the name
 Barry Chant (born 1938), Australian author and co-founder of Tabor College Australia
 Christopher Chant, fictional nine-lived enchanter in the Chrestomanci series by Diana Wynne Jones
 Clarence Chant (1865–1956), Canadian astronomer and physicist
 Donald Chant (1928–2007), Canadian biologist
Joy Chant (born 1945), British fantasy author
 Ken Chant (born 1933), Australian Pentecostal pastor
Kerry Chant, Australian physician and public health officer
 Susie Chant, Canadian politician

Music

Albums
 Chant (Benedictine Monks of Santo Domingo de Silos album), 1994
 Chant (Donald Byrd album), 1979
 Chant (Merzbow album), 1985
 Chant: Music For Paradise (titled Chant: Music for the Soul in the US), a 2008 album performed by the Heiligenkreuz Abbey
 Chants (Craig Taborn album), 2012
 The Chant (album)

Songs 

 "Chant", by Fourplay from Between the Sheets, 1993
 "Chant", by Macklemore and Tones And I
 "Chant", song from Hadestown
 "Chant", by Jeff Majors

Groups
 Chants R&B, a rhythm and blues band from Christchurch, New Zealand

Other uses
 Chant (crater), a lunar crater
 Chant (horse) (born 1891), American Thoroughbred racehorse that won the 1894 Kentucky Derby
 CHANT (ship type), a type of coastal tanker built in the UK during the Second World War